Stefano Tomasini (born 20 August 1963) is an Italian former professional cyclist, who competed between the years of 1987 and 1990. Tomasini is most known for winning the Young rider Classification at the 1988. That year, he finished ninth overall. That was his highest finish at the Giro in his short career.

Major results

1987
1st  Overall Herald Sun Tour
1st Stage 11 
1988
1st Memorial Gastone Nencini
1st Trofeo dello Scalatore
3rd Overall Herald Sun Tour
3rd G.P. Camaiore
9th Overall Giro d'Italia
1st  Young rider classification
1989
1st Stage 2 Giro del Trentino
5th Giro di Toscana
1990
4th Overall Ruota d'Oro
7th Overall Giro del Trentino

References

External links

1963 births
Living people
Italian male cyclists
Cyclists from the Province of Bergamo